"Valentine" is a song from Lloyd's second studio album, Street Love, peaked at number #60 on the Billboard Hot R&B/Hip-Hop Songs chart.
The track was produced by Wally Morris, Lloyd Polite, J.Irby, and T.W. Hale. The track was written by Lloyd Polite. All vocals are by Lloyd Polite. It was only released on radio as a promotion single.

Remix
There's a remix featuring Slim Thug and Bun B, which is now called "Travel".

Charts 

Lloyd (singer) songs
2007 singles
Songs written by Lloyd (singer)
2007 songs
Universal Music Group singles